"Sleeping Satellite" is a song by British singer-songwriter Tasmin Archer, released in September 1992 as the first single from her debut album, Great Expectations (1992). Co-written by Archer, the song received favorable reviews from music critics and became an international hit. It peaked at number-one in the United Kingdom, Ireland, Greece and Israel, and reached the top 20 in 13 other countries as well as number 32 on the US Billboard Hot 100 in June 1993. There were produced two different music videos to promote the single.

Lyrics and music
Although "Sleeping Satellite" was first released in 1992, Archer and her co-writers, John Beck and John Hughes, actually wrote and composed the song in the late 1980s. It was only when Archer got a record deal that the song saw the light of day.

On the song, John Hughes and Robbie McIntosh played guitar, with John Beck and Paul Wickens playing keyboards. The drummer was Graham Broadhead, whilst Gary Maughan played the Fairlight. Archer sings backing vocals on the track along with Tessa Niles and Carol Kenyon. The lyrics of the song reference the 1968–1972 Apollo missions, characterised as "man's greatest adventure"; the sleeping satellite of the title being the Moon.

Chart performance
"Sleeping Satellite" was released in the United Kingdom on 1 September 1992 and swiftly rose up the charts, replacing the Shamen's "Ebeneezer Goode" at number one in October. It stayed at the top for two weeks before being dethroned by Boyz II Men's "End of the Road". It also topped the charts in neighbouring Ireland, spending four weeks at number one. It remains Archer's only top-ten hit in both the UK and Ireland to date.

Outside the UK and Ireland, "Sleeping Satellite" topped the chart in Greece and was a top-ten hit in numerous other European countries, including France, Italy, the Netherlands, Sweden and Switzerland. To date, it is Archer's only charting single in the United States, peaking at number 32 on the Billboard Hot 100 in June 1993 and number 24 on the Adult Contemporary chart. In neighbouring Canada, "Sleeping Satellite" reached number six.

Critical reception
In his review of "Sleeping Satellite", Steve Morse from The Boston Globe wrote, "Heady stuff for a newcomer, but Archer sounds timeless with her deep, mind-imprinting voice." Kent Zimmerman from the Gavin Report declared it "a treasure of a song from England", adding, "As the seconds tick away, the song keeps right on building, with guitars, keyboards and a fantastic chorus." In his weekly UK chart commentary, James Masterton viewed it as a "classy ballad from a new singer-songwriter". Pan-European magazine Music & Media felt it's a "brilliant soulful pop song with a slightly spacey production". A reviewer from Music Week called it "stylish", adding that it's "both commercial and credible and should prompt a higher than average take-up for her aptly-named debut album". 

Ian McCann from New Musical Express said, "There's no hit here, but given the right bullshit production she could stick out the next 'Damn I Wish Etc'". Another editor, Nancy Culp, stated, "Where she scores is when she manages something which is different, such as the haunting 'Sleeping Satellite'". Gerald Martinez from New Sunday Times wrote, "While the lyrics were evocative and interesting, it was the overall feel of the music, plus her low evocative voice, that had a quietly propulsive rhythm that made it special." Nick Duerden from Select described it as "sultry" and "soulful". Charles Aaron from Spin commented, "A British-Jamaican soul stylist (shades of Sade and Caron Wheeler) who makes her velvety voice go scratchy so we'll go weak in the knees, such as on the purportedly eco-conscious line: "Still we try to justify the waste for a taste of man's greatest adventure." Whatever. She could croon in Esperanto about the national debt and I'd swoon."

Retrospective response
Retrospectively, AllMusic editor Roch Parisien complimented the song as a "hypnotic, fashionably retro-psych-soul beauty". In 2011, Tom Ewing of Freaky Trigger wrote, "This, it seems to me, is part of what "Sleeping Satellite"'s articulating: a sense of disappointment bordering on betrayal that having dreamed of the Moon – or indeed, because it got there – humanity now seems confined to a slowly boiling Earth. This is potent, raw stuff and very difficult indeed to cover effectively in a pop song. And in truth Archer doesn't cover it effectively – the song's ambiguous and flowery, its emotional kick comes from Archer's self-belief more than anything you can read into it. But I have to say I like the idea that she tried." In 2012, Porcys ranked the song number 59 in their list of "100 Singles 1990–1999", declaring it as a "ideal pop-soul ballad". They added that "technically, "Sleeping Satellite" is an elegant blend of acoustics with synthetics, starting from the chic cascade, unloading the pomposity of a piece on a bridge built of psychedelic keyboard variations."

Music video
Two different music videos were made for the song; a European version and a US version. The European music video was directed by Zanna.

Track listings

 UK 7-inch and cassette single
US and Australasian cassette single
 "Sleeping Satellite" – 4:41
 "Sleeping Satellite" (acoustic version) – 3:21

 UK 12-inch single
A1. "Sleeping Satellite"
A2. "Sleeping Satellite" (acoustic version)
B1. "Sleeping Satellite" (extended version)

 UK CD single
 "Sleeping Satellite"
 "Sleeping Satellite" (acoustic version)
 "Man at the Window" (acoustic version)
 "Sleeping Satellite" (extended version)

 US CD single
 "Sleeping Satellite" – 4:41
 "Sleeping Satellite" (acoustic version) – 3:21
 Interview

 Japanese mini-CD single
 "Sleeping Satellite"
 "In Your Care

Charts

Weekly charts

Year-end charts

Certifications

Release history

Cover versions
 1992: A dance remake was released by Italy-based Ketty DB featuring the same lyrics and melody but with a danceable, haunting arrangement.
 2003: Another dance cover was recorded by British group Aurora featuring Irish singer-songwriter Naimee Coleman. Released as a single in Australia on 23 June 2003, it reached number 60 on the ARIA Singles Chart the following week.
 2005: The song was covered by Australian progressive rock band Karnivool and was released as the B-side to their single "Themata".
2007: Danish singer Bryan Rice covered the song for his second album Good News.
2007: Russian vocal drum and bass duo Stim Axel mixed a cover.
 2008: A house remix of the song was released by French DJ Junior Caldera and peaked at number 37 on the French singles chart.
 2009: Lady Gaga was inspired by the song for her track "So Happy I Could Die" on The Fame Monster.
 2009: Jan Johnston released a cover with multiple mixes on the Perfecto label.
 2010: Enduser used the sample from the song in his song "2/3" (from "1/3" EP).
 2011: Kim Wilde recorded the song for her covers album, Snapshots, and it was released as the lead single along with "It's Alright".
2012: Stereolove (also known as James Fraser) released an electronic down-tempo cover in August. The track reached number one on the Juno Records UK Pop/Trance charts in November 2012, as well as reaching the top on Kiss FM and Joy 94.9 in Melbourne, Australia. The track reached number 23 on the US DJ Pool Starfleet Top 50 Dance chart.

References

1992 songs
1992 debut singles
Tasmin Archer songs
2011 singles
Kim Wilde songs
Works about the Moon
Number-one singles in Greece
Number-one singles in Israel
Irish Singles Chart number-one singles
UK Singles Chart number-one singles
Songs written by Tasmin Archer
Songs written by John Beck (songwriter)
Song recordings produced by Julian Mendelsohn
EMI Records singles
SBK Records singles
Music videos directed by Zanna (director)
Songs about outer space
Songs based on actual events